Michael Collier is an American photographer.  His work is often aerial photography of landscapes.  He was featured in a recent NPR show and photo montage narrated by Howard Berkes called Sky Vision. Collier's photographs in the book The Mountains Know Arizona won the National Outdoor Book Award in 2004 for Design and Artistic Merit.

Education
Michael Collier received his education from the following institutions:
Northern Arizona University-BS in geology 
Stanford-  MS in structural geology
University of Arizona-MD

Biography
Michael Collier used to have the job of rowing boats in the Grand Canyon. Collier currently practices medicine in Flagstaff, Arizona for his career. He also is a professor at the NAU School of Earth Sciences and Environmental Sustainability.

Works
Michael Collier has created several books on the following:
Colorado River basin
Glaciers of Alaska
Climate change in Alaska
A three-book series on American mountains, rivers, and coastlines
As a special projects writer, Collier also was able to write and photograph books about the following:
San Andreas Fault
Downstream effects of dams
Climate change
Collier has also created an app compatible for iPads that allow the user to view and learn about landscapes viewed from the air. He has also been a provider for a collection of stock photos.

Awards
Michael Collier has received the awards that include:
1997-Shoemaker Communication Award
2000-National Park Service Director's Award
2005-American Geological Institute's Public Contribution to Geosciences Award
2007, 2008, 2009-Outstanding Science Trade Book award
2012-National Outdoor Book Award (Nature & Environment category)

References

External links
  Michael Collier's website

American photographers
Living people
Year of birth missing (living people)